"Think About Us" is a song by British girl group Little Mix. A remixed version featuring American singer Ty Dolla Sign was released on January 25, 2019, as the second and final single from their fifth studio album, LM5 (2018). It was written by Kamille, Goldfingers, Frank Nobel, Ty Dolla Sign and Victor Bolander, and produced by Kamille, Goldfingers and Louis Bell.

Music Critics described the song as a pop track with elements of tropical pop and Latin music. It was met with positive reviews from critics who praised the song for its upbeat tempo and good vibes feeling. The song lyrically addresses themes of love and heartbreak. The single peaked at number twenty-two on the UK Singles Chart and charted in eight other countries. It has since been certified platinum in Brazil and gold in Poland and the United Kingdom.

Composition
"Think About Us" is a pop power ballad with elements of tropical house, Afrobeats and Latin pop. Built around a dance breakdown, the track eschews common ballad structure in favour of more rhythmic verses.

The lyrics find the group questioning the seriousness of a relationship and whether their partner wants to be with them. Ty Dolla Sign responds in his verse near the end of the song by singing about how he is similarly affected by the relationship's insecurity. His verse is sung alongside Jesy Nelson and Jade Thirlwall.

Critical reception
Mike Nied from Idolator deemed the song "stunning" and wrote, "Built around an infectious break, it is a lush floor filler." Megan Downing from MTV UK called it "the storming emotional pop banger we all need in our lives right now", while Michael Silver of Billboard magazine described it as "danceable". Writing for People magazine, Tomás Mier found the track similar to "Cheap Thrills" by Sia and complimented its "catchy beat". The National said "Think About Us" has "Beyoncé-like swagger" and after listening to it "you are left with a pleasantly guilty feeling." Attitude magazine's Joe Passmore wrote that while not as experimental as other tracks from LM5, its "slight Latin vibe is on trend and it sounds like an easily consumable radio single".

Music video

Background and concept

Directed by Bradley & Pablo, the music video for "Think About Us" was filmed in London on 12 December 2018. Intended as a more honest and authentic representation of Little Mix, Bradley & Pablo used a mature and stripped back execution based on the sound of LM5. They eschewed polished visuals in favour of "effortlessly sexy" styling and candid scenes inspired by 1990s Calvin Klein campaigns, and opted for the group not to perform choreography to show a side to them that is "less like a tightly controlled performance and more like them". Leigh-Anne Pinnock invited her fiancé, English footballer Andre Gray to appear in the video.

The concept has a double meaning and was a collaborative process, according to Bradley & Pablo. It has a theme of paranoia, control and surveillance, based on "emotions and sensations that you experience in a relationship that may be lost in a future where certain kinds of intimacy are no longer possible." The concept alludes to Little Mix's fame by using contained sets within an industrial space and staging inspired by Jeremy Bentham's Panopticon.

Synopsis
Each member of Little Mix has their own set-up in the music video inspired by different stages of a relationship. Candid scenes from each set-up are intercut throughout. It opens with Perrie Edwards lying in a meadow filled with butterflies, based on the start of a relationship and the feeling of butterflies in the stomach. Representing the icy end to a relationship, Jade Thirlwall is shown fighting a snowstorm in a white lace bralet, white padded jacket and tartan, long plaid maxi skirt.

In her passion scene, Jesy Nelson wears a red halterneck and high-waisted denim jeans, and straddles a topless man. In her scene representing dangers in a relationship, Leigh-Anne Pinnock in a leather two-piece, wraps her legs around Gray sitting on a motorcycle for their segment. The group then come together in all-white and body-to-body rave scenes with Ty Dolla Sign.

Live performances
Little Mix gave their first live performance of "Think About Us" on The Graham Norton Show on 14 December 2018. On 12 January 2019, the group performed the song on The Brits Are Coming. They also performed the track along with "Woman Like Me" on The Voice of Holland on 1 February 2019, and at the 2019 Global Awards on 7 March 2019. The group has performed this song on different music festivals like the BBC Radio 1's Big Weekend on May 26, the Fusion Festival on September 1, and the GRLS Festival on March 8, 2020. The song was also regularly performed on LM5: The Tour.

Personnel
 Jesy Nelson – vocals 
 Leigh-Anne Pinnock – vocals
 Jade Thirlwall – vocals
 Perrie Edwards – vocals 
 Kamille – production, vocal production and recording, piano, keyboards, drum programming, backing vocals
 Goldfingers – production, vocal production, piano, keyboards, drum programming
 Louis Bell – production
 Frank Nobel – piano, keys, drum programming, backing vocals
 Liam Nolan – vocal engineering 
 Jason Elliot – vocal engineering 
 Joe Kearns – additional vocal production and recording 
 Phil Tan – mixing
 Bill Zimmerman – engineering assistance
 Randy Merrill – mastering
 James Royo – mixing, vocal engineering 
Credits adapted from Qobuz.

Charts

Certifications

Release history

References

2019 singles
2019 songs
Little Mix songs
Songs written by Kamille (musician)
Songs written by Ty Dolla Sign
Syco Music singles
Ty Dolla Sign songs